The St. Aberkios Monastery is a former Greek Orthodox church in Kurşunlu. The church was the katholikon of the 12th-century monastery of Elegmi. The monastic typikon, issued in 1162, makes clear that the monastery was granted to the author of the document, Nikephoros, the mystikos in the service of Manuel I Komnenos. Even though the ktetor's account of the reconstruction works does not state the erection of the church, the architectural features of St. Aberkios clearly indicate its 12th-century origins.

References

Eastern Orthodox church buildings in Turkey
Former churches in Turkey
Buildings and structures in Bursa Province